The cabinet of the Government of Serbia, led by prime minister Aleksandar Vučić, was elected on 27 April 2014 by a majority vote in the National Assembly. It comprised ministers from the Serbian Progressive Party, Socialist Party of Serbia, Social Democratic Party of Serbia, Movement of Socialists and New Serbia, as well as some independent ministers. The cabinet was voted in on April 28, 2014.

On 17 January 2016 Vučić called for a snap election claiming Serbia "needs four more years of stability so that it is ready to join the European Union". The National Assembly was dissolved on 3 March, thus turning the cabinet into a caretaker government.

Parliamentary election was held on 24 April 2016, and Vučić's Serbian Progressive Party-led coalition retained its majority, winning 131 of the 250 seats. Vučić announced the new cabinet on 8 August, consisting of eight old and eight new ministers, retaining the coalition with the Socialist Party. The new government was approved by the National Assembly on August 10.

Cabinet members

See also
Cabinet of Ivica Dačić
List of prime ministers of Serbia
Cabinet of Serbia

References

External links

Cabinets of Serbia
2014 establishments in Serbia
Cabinets established in 2014